Behabad-e Qobasiah (also Romanized as Behābād-e Qobāsīāh; also known as Beyābād and Bīābād-e Qobā Sīāh) is a village in Howmeh Rural District, in the Central District of Gilan-e Gharb County, Kermanshah Province, Iran. At the 2006 census, its population was 53, in 10 families.

References 

Populated places in Gilan-e Gharb County